The Stockholm municipal election of 1994 was held on 18 September 1994, concurrently with the 1994 Swedish general election.  Using a party-list proportional representation system to allocate the 101 seats of the Stockholm city council (Stockholms kommunfullmäktige) amongst the various Swedish political parties.  Voter turnout was 81.2%.

Two parties disappeared from the city council as a result this election.  The Christian Democratic Social Party, after winning seats on the city council for the first time in the previous election in 1991, lost all their seats, though they would regain a mandate in 1998 and retain it in each subsequent election (as of the 2006 elections).

The right-wing New Democracy party lost all six of their previously held seats as a result of  this election, though they managed to hold on to a mandate to the national Swedish Riksdag as part of the concurrent parliamentary election.  The party would never regain seats on the Stockholm City Council, and was declared bankrupt in 2000.

Results

See also
 Elections in Sweden
 List of political parties in Sweden
 City of Stockholm

Notes
  No separate election data available for New Democracy or the Stockholm Party.

References
Statistics Sweden, "Kommunfullmäktigval – valresultat" (Swedish) 
Statistics Sweden, "Kommunfullmäktigval – erhållna mandat efter kommun och parti. Valår 1973–2006" (Swedish) 

Municipal elections in Stockholm
1994 elections in Sweden
1990s in Stockholm
September 1994 events in Europe